Paul Kiedl (born 2 October 2001) is a Austrian professional footballer who plays as a striker for Austrian Regionalliga club SC Kaldsdorf, on loan from Austrian 2. Liga club Grazer AK.

Early life 
Kiedl was born in Deutschlandsberg, Austria.

Career 

Kiedl started his career with Grazer AK.
He made his professional debut for Grazer AK in 2020, playing 8 games in his first season going professional, and scoring 2 goals, his best season recorded yet. Kiedl played 11 games the following season (2020–2), his highest tally of league games in a single season, and the next season, Kiedl got a goal and an assist in 8 games. In the 2022–23 season, Kiedl played his first cup game, and in January, with 3 league appearances, and 1 cup appearance, he signed on loan with SC Kalsdorf.

Personal life 

Kiedl has a younger brother named Peter.

External links 

 Paul Kiedl at World Football
 Paul Kiedl at Soccerway

References 

Living people
2001 births
2. Liga (Austria) players
Austrian Regionalliga players
SK Sturm Graz players
Austrian football biography stubs
Austrian footballers
Kapfenberger SV players
Grazer AK players
Association football forwards
People from Deutschlandsberg District
Regionalliga players